#3 World Tour is the second concert tour by Irish alternative rock band The Script. Launched in support of their third studio album #3 (2012), the tour began in Ireland with two intimate shows in Cork and Dublin.

Itinerary
The world tour started in Ireland with two intimate shows in Cork and Dublin which took place in September, thus kicking off the tour. These shows were only announced three days before the shows took place and were only available from one Ticketmaster outlet in each city. They also performed three intimate club shows in Glasgow, Manchester and London. They performed one show in Sydney to showcase new material from #3 as well as tracks from previous albums. The North American leg began in New York City on 9 October with a further 18 shows across the United States and Canada. On 18 September, A twelve date arena tour of Ireland and the United Kingdom was announced for March 2013. Before returning to Australia, the band performed in South Korea, at Seoul's AX Hall. The band then returned to Australia to perform their biggest tour yet down under with four shows across the country. The final show of the tour was on 12 April at the Vector Arena in Auckland New Zealand marking the band's first concert there and the closure of the official #3 world tour. Over the summer of 2013 they continued to promote their album at several summer music festivals, as well as playing as the opening act for Train.

Support Acts
Sinéad Burgess (Sydney, Metro Theatre)
Tristan Prettyman (North America, select dates)
The Original Rudeboys (Europe, 21 January—2 February, Ireland, select dates & United Kingdom, Australia)
Hudson Taylor (Ireland, select dates)
Brooke Duff (New Zealand, 12 April 2013)

Setlist
"Good Ol' Days"
"We Cry"
"Breakeven"
"Science & Faith"
"The Man Who Can't Be Moved"
"If You Could See Me Now"
"Before The Worst"
"If You Ever Come Back"
"Talk You Down"
"Nothing"
"I'm Yours"
"Six Degrees of Separation"
"For The First Time"
Encore
"You Won't Feel A Thing"
"Hall of Fame"
Source:

Tour dates

Box office score data

Cancellations and rescheduled shows

Festivals and other miscellaneous performances
This show was part of Mark & Mercedes Not So Silent Night.
This show was part of Capital FM Jingle Bell Ball.
This show is part of the Dubai International Jazz Festival.
This show is part of the Isle of Wight Festival.
This show is part of the Thy Rock Festival.
This show is part of T in the Park.
This show is part of Rock Werchter.
This show is part of the Peace & Love Festival.
This show is part of the Rock-A-Field Festival.
This show is part of the Hove Festival.
This show is part of Radio 1's Big Weekend.
These shows are part of the V Festival.
Leeds and Blackpool shows were cancelled due to family illness.

References

2012 concert tours
2013 concert tours
The Script concert tours